Platycheirus scutatus is a very common species of hoverfly. It is a Holarctic species.

Description
External images
For terms, see: Morphology of Diptera. Face has two large, silver-grey dust spots. Tergite 4 is elongate.

See references for determination.

Distribution
Palearctic: Fennoscandia south to Iberia and the Mediterranean basin from Ireland eastward through Northern Europe, Central Europe and Southern Europe into Turkey and European Russia and through Siberia to the Pacific coast and Japan. Nearctic: Alaska south to Colorado. But see Speight (2011).

Biology
The larvae feed on aphids on low-growing plants and trees. Adults feed on a wide range of flowers. They have multiple broods throughout the warmer months and have a very long flight period. They may stay active during cold weather.

References

Diptera of Europe
Syrphinae
Insects described in 1822